Shatrovo is a village in Bobov Dol Municipality, Kyustendil Province, south-western Bulgaria. Some Aromanian nomads settled here in the 19th century.

References

Villages in Kyustendil Province
Aromanian settlements in Bulgaria